is a 2013 Japanese animated fantasy film directed by Takayuki Hirao, based on the Noroiya Shimai series of Japanese comics by Hirarin.

It is also known in English as Magical Sisters Yoyo and Nene, Little Witches Yoyo & Nene, or Magical Witches Yoyo and Nene, or Magical Sisters Yoyo & Nene.

Cast

Sumire Morohoshi as Yoyo
Ai Kakuma as Nene
Takahiro Sakurai as Takeo
Miyuki Sawashiro as Takahiro
Rio Sasaki as Aki

Plot

Yoyo and Nene work as "noroiya" (cursers) using magic in a fantasy world. One day a big tree suddenly appears in a forest, and tall buildings that look like they are from another world (our world) can be seen entangled in it. The two sisters go there to investigate, and Yoyo gets transported to our world. Yoyo then encounters two children who are startled by her sudden appearance and rush back home.  But, at home they find their parents turning into monsters.

References

External links
  
 

2013 fantasy films
2013 films
2013 anime films
Japanese animated fantasy films
Magical girl anime and manga
Ufotable